Aircraft markings are symbols and annotations painted on aircraft, primarily for identification. Types of aircraft markings include:

 Aircraft registration, unique alphanumeric string that identifies every aircraft
 Invasion stripes, alternating black and white bands painted on the fuselages and wings of World War II Allied aircraft, for the purpose of increased recognition by friendly forces
 Military aircraft insignia, applied to military aircraft to identify the nation or branch of military service
 Hungarian Air Force, a set of aligned triangles which points toward the front of the aircraft
 Romanian Air Force#Aircraft markings, roundels on military vehicles and aircraft that use the colours of the Romanian flag
 Royal Canadian Air Force, roundels used from 1920–1945
 Royal Air Force roundels, a circular identification mark used since 1915, United Kingdom
 Serbian Air Force and Air Defence, an adapted version of the former Royal Yugoslav Air Force roundel that was officially adopted in 2006
 South African Air Force, roundels adopted in 2002 that are distinct from the Army
 United Kingdom military aircraft serials, the serial numbers used to identify individual military aircraft
 United States:
 United States military aircraft national insignia, a listing of the nationality markings used by military aircraft of the United States
 United States military aircraft serials, the serial numbers used to identify individual military aircraft
 USAAF unit identification aircraft markings, an identification code to identify the unit to which U.S. aircraft are assigned
 Nose art, decorative painting or design on the fuselage of an aircraft
 Tail code, markings, usually on the vertical stabilizer of U.S. military aircraft, that help to identify the unit and base assignment
 List of air forces provides the markings used by each military organization, with historical examples.

See also
 Aircraft livery, the full graphic treatment of aircraft, often for branding
 
 Marking (disambiguation)

 
Insignia
Broad-concept articles